A Nest of Gentry is a 1969 Soviet drama film directed by Andrey Konchalovsky.

Plot 
Fyodor Ivanovich Lavretsky returns to his estate after 11 years in Paris, in which his wife remained. Frustrated by life, deceived by his wife who had cheated on him, exhausted by a long separation from Russia   this is how the hero looks at the beginning of the film. Soon, Lavretsky falls in love with his charming young cousin's daughter, Lisa. After some time, Lavretsky learns from the newspapers about the death of his wife in Paris. The declaration of love to Lisa and the simultaneous arrival of the suddenly  risen  wife's estate complicate a seemingly simple story.

Cast 
 Irina Kupchenko as Liza
 Leonid Kulagin as Lavretsky
 Beata Tyszkiewicz as Varvara Pavlovna
 Tamara Chernova as Maria Dmitriyevna
 Viktor Sergachyov as Panshin
 Vasili Merkuryev as Gedeonovsky
 Aleksandr Kostomolotsky as Lemm
 Mariya Durasova as Marfa Timofeyevna
 Vladimir Kochurikhin as Anton
 Sergey Nikonenko as Grishka
 Nikita Mikhalkov as  Prince Nelidov
 Nikolay Gubenko as  Sitnikov

Awards
 1973 Jussi Award
 Best foreign director (Andrey  Konchalovsky)

References

External links 
 
 

1969 films
1960s Russian-language films
Soviet drama films
1969 drama films
Mosfilm films
Films directed by Andrei Konchalovsky
Films based on works by Ivan Turgenev